Zalipie  is a small rural village in south-eastern Poland, in Gmina Olesno, Dąbrowa County, Lesser Poland Voivodeship.

It is known for a local custom of painting the cottages with decorative motifs. The former home of local artist Felicja Curyłowa is perhaps one of the best examples of this tradition.

References

Zalipie